Lega Nuova (New League) was a short-lived regionalist political party active in Lombardy.

Lega Nuova was founded in 1991 by Franco Castellazzi, national president of Lega Lombarda–Lega Nord in collision with the party's leader Umberto Bossi, and by five other regional councillors from that party. By the 1992 general election some of those returned into Lega Lombarda, while Castellazzi and others ran within the lists of the Italian Democratic Socialist Party without success.

Sources
Adalberto Signore; Alessandro Trocino, Razza padana, BUR, Milan 2008
David Parenzo; Davide Romano, Romanzo padano. Da Bossi a Bossi. Storia della Lega, Sperling & Kupfer, Milan 2009
Francesco Jori, Dalla Łiga alla Lega. Storia, movimenti, protagonisti, Marsilio, Venice 2009

Political parties in Lombardy
Political parties established in 1991
1991 establishments in Italy
Political parties with year of disestablishment missing